Lake Conasauga is a reservoir in Floyd County, in the U.S. state of Georgia.

The lake was named after deposits of Conasauga shale seen there.

See also
List of lakes in Georgia (U.S. state)

References

Geography of Floyd County, Georgia
Conasauga